The 2002 The 500 presented by Toyota was the eighteenth round of the 2002 CART FedEx Champ Car World Series season, held on November 3, 2002 at the California Speedway in Fontana, California, United States.

The race was won by Jimmy Vasser, the final Champ Car victory for the 1996 season champion.  The race was completed in 2 hours, 33 minutes, 42.9877 seconds, for an average speed of 195.185 MPH under the common 2.000 mile measuring standard used by NASCAR and INDYCAR.  Because of CART's discrepancy in listing the track at 2.029 miles for a 507.25 mile race, they listed the average speed at 197.995 MPH.  Regardless, it was the record for the fastest 500 mile race ever contested until it was broken at the 2014 Pocono IndyCar 500 (2:28:13). 

The 500 at Fontana was the final 500 mile race in Champ Car history.  A 500-mile race scheduled at the same race track in 2003, the 2003 King Taco 500, was cancelled because of wildfires in Southern California.  No further 500 mile races were scheduled by CART for the remainder of its history. Also, other than the famed Indianapolis 500, it was the last 500-mile open wheel race for ten years, when IndyCar Series held the 2012 MAVTV 500 IndyCar World Championships at Fontana as the season finale.

Qualifying results

Race

Caution flags

Notes 

 New Race Record Jimmy Vasser 2:33:42.977
 Average Speed 197.995 mph (Fastest 500 mile race in history; using the CART standard of 2.029 miles;  195.185 mph using the more recognised 2.000 mile distance)

References

 Vasser wins fastest 500-mile open wheel race in Fontana
 Qualifying Results
 Race Results

NOTE:  In 2002, both Championship Auto Racing Teams, Inc. (500 miles), and Indy Racing League, LLC (400 miles) held races at Fontana.  Both sanctioning bodies scheduled races in 2003, but the CART event was called off because of wildfires.  From 2004-05, only the IRL held races for open-wheel racing at Fontana.  In 2012, the next open-wheel California 500 was held, again by the now-unified Indy Racing League, LLC (dba INDYCAR).

Fontana
MAVTV 500
November 2002 sports events in the United States